The 1994/95 FIS Snowboard World Cup was 1st multi race tournament over a season for snowboarding organised by International Ski Federation. The season started on 11 November 1994 and ended on 1 April 1995. This season included four disciplines: parallel slalom, giant slalom, slalom and halfpipe.

Men

Giant slalom

Slalom

Parallel

Halpipe

Ladies

Giant slalom

Slalom

Parallel

Halpipe

Standings: Men

Giant slalom

Standings after 8 races.

Slalom

Standings after 5 races.

Parallel

Standings after 5 races.

Halfpipe

Standings after 5 races.

Standings: Ladies

Giant slalom

Standings after 8 races.

Slalom

Standings after 5 races.

Parallel

Standings after 5 races.

Halfpipe

Standings after 5 races.

References

FIS Snowboard World Cup
1994 in snowboarding
1995 in snowboarding